"Only My Heart Calling" is a song from New Zealand singer Margaret Urlich. Released in May 1990, it was the second Australian single from her debut studio album, Safety in Numbers. Although only peaking at number 46, the single spent 22 weeks on the Australian top 100 singles chart. The song features on her 1994 live album Live.

Track listing 
CD single (CBS 655924 2)
 "Only My Heart Calling" – 5:38
 "Something in the Air"	
 "Slip On By" (Live)

Charts

References

External links 
 Only My Heart Calling at Discogs

1989 songs
1990 singles
Margaret Urlich songs
CBS Records singles
Songs written by Robyn Smith (record producer)